"Did It for the Girl" is a song recorded by American country music artist Greg Bates. It was released in April 2012 as his debut single. Bates co-wrote the song with Lynn Hutton and Rodney Clawson.

Critical reception
Billy Dukes of Taste of Country gave the song four stars out of five, saying that it is "instantly memorable — if only for its clean simplicity." Matt Bjorke of Roughstock also gave the song a favorable review, writing that Bates "marries the best of the neo-traditionalist movement with the modern country world." Joseph Fafinski of Preserving Country Music called it the best single of 2012.

Music video
The music video was directed by Brian Lazzaro and premiered in July 2012.

Chart performance
"Did It for the Girl" debuted at number 57 on the U.S. Billboard Hot Country Songs chart for the week of April 28, 2012. It also debuted at number 100 on the U.S. Billboard Hot 100 chart for the week of October 6, 2012.

Year-end charts

References

2012 debut singles
2012 songs
Greg Bates songs
Republic Records singles
Songs written by Rodney Clawson
Republic Nashville singles
Songs written by Lynn Hutton